The Great Spokane Fire—known locally as The Great Fire—was a major fire which affected downtown Spokane, Washington (called "Spokane Falls" at the time) on August 4, 1889. It began just after 6:00 p.m. and destroyed the city's downtown commercial district.  Due to technical problems with a pump station, there was no water pressure in the city when the fire started. In a desperate bid to starve the fire, firefighters began razing buildings with dynamite. Eventually winds died down and the fire exhausted of its own accord. As a result of the fire and its aftermath, virtually all of Spokane's downtown was destroyed, though only one person was killed.

The cause of the fire was never determined. Theories included a cooking fire in a lunchroom, a curling iron being heated in a kerosene lamp, and a spark from a passing train.

Three cities in Washington had "great fires" in the summer of 1889. The Great Seattle Fire destroyed the entire central business district of Seattle on June 6, 1889. The Great Ellensburg Fire resulted in the city's bid to become the state capital ending in failure.

Other fires that summer in the U.S. included the Santiago Canyon Fire around Orange County, California and the Great Bakersfield Fire of 1889.

Despite this catastrophe, Spokane continued to grow; the fire set the stage for a building boom. Architect Chauncey B. Seaton came to Spokane to work on rebuilding projects after the fire. He designed the Review Building. The town hosted the Northwest Industrial Exposition in 1890. The main building was designed by Richard H. Martin, Jr.

After the Great Fire of 1889 and the rebuilding of the downtown, the city was reincorporated under the present name of "Spokane" in 1891. Just three years after the fire, in 1892, James J. Hill's Great Northern Railway had arrived in the newly created township of Hillyard (annexed by Spokane in 1924)—the chosen site for Hill's rail yards.

See also
Great Fire of 1910

References

History of Spokane, Washington
1889 fires in the United States
1889 in Washington (state)
Fires in Washington (state)
Spokane Fire, Great